Amanda Jayne Green (born 19 March 1984) is a New Zealand former cricketer who played as a right-arm medium bowler. She appeared in fourteen One Day Internationals and one Twenty20 International for New Zealand between 2003 and 2004. She played domestic cricket for Wellington, Auckland and Otago.

References

External links
 
 

1984 births
Living people
People from Tūrangi
New Zealand women cricketers
New Zealand women One Day International cricketers
New Zealand women Twenty20 International cricketers
Wellington Blaze cricketers
Auckland Hearts cricketers
Otago Sparks cricketers
Cricketers from Waikato